La Palma (Spanish for "The Palm") is a city in Orange County, California, United States. The population was 15,568 at the 2010 Census, up from 15,408 at the 2000 census.

History
La Palma was incorporated on October 26, 1955. It was originally incorporated as Dairyland, and was one of three dairy cities in the region (the other two being Dairy Valley, now Cerritos, and Dairy City, now Cypress) but when the dairies moved east in 1965, the name of the community was changed to La Palma, after the region's Spanish heritage and its main thoroughfare, La Palma Avenue.

Geography
This makes it the smallest city in Orange County in terms of area.

Demographics

2010
The 2010 US Census reported that La Palma had a population of 15,568. The racial makeup of La Palma was 5,762 (37.0%) White (27.8% Non-Hispanic White), 802 (5.2%) African American, 56 (0.4%) Native American, 7,483 (48.1%) Asian, 41 (0.3%) Pacific Islander, 760 (4.9%) from other races, and 664 (4.3%) from two or more races. Hispanic or Latino of any race were 2,487 persons (16.0%).

The census reported that 15,548 people (99.9% of the population) lived in households, 14 (0.1%) lived in non-institutionalized group quarters, and 6 (0%) were institutionalized.

There were 5,080 households, 1,949 (38.4%) had children under the age of 18 living in them, 3,331 (65.6%) were opposite-sex married couples living together, 641 (12.6%) had a female householder with no husband present, 240 (4.7%) had a male householder with no wife present.  There were 134 (2.6%) unmarried opposite-sex partnerships, and 26 (0.5%) same-sex married couples or partnerships. 716 households (14.1%) were one person and 389 (7.7%) had someone living alone who was 65 or older. The average household size was 3.06.  There were 4,212 families (82.9% of households); the average family size was 3.37.

The age distribution was 3,423 people (22.0%) under the age of 18, 1,418 people (9.1%) aged 18 to 24, 3,805 people (24.4%) aged 25 to 44, 4,445 people (28.6%) aged 45 to 64, and 2,477 people (15.9%) who were 65 or older.  The median age was 41.2 years. For every 100 females, there were 93.5 males.  For every 100 females age 18 and over, there were 90.7 males.

There were 5,224 housing units at an average density of 2,852.0 per square mile, of the occupied units 3,648 (71.8%) were owner-occupied and 1,432 (28.2%) were rented. The homeowner vacancy rate was 0.3%; the rental vacancy rate was 6.0%.  11,315 people (72.7% of the population) lived in owner-occupied housing units and 4,233 people (27.2%) lived in rental housing units.

According to the 2010 United States Census, La Palma had a median household income of $87,289, with 7.2% of the population living below the federal poverty line.

2000
At the 2000 census there were 15,408 people in 4,979 households, including 4,227 families, in the city. The population density was 8,499.3 inhabitants per square mile (3,286.8/km). The racial makeup of the city was 44.6% Asian, 36.3% White, 10.3% Hispanic, 4.5% Black, .3% Pacific Islander, .2% Native American, .2% from other races, and 3.5% from two or more races.
Of the 4,979 households 37.3% had children under the age of 18 living with them, 69.5% were married couples living together, 10.8% had a female householder with no husband present, and 15.1% were non-families. 11.6% of households were one person and 3.6% were one person aged 65 or older.  The average household size was 3.09 and the average family size was 3.35.

The age distribution was 23.8% under the age of 18, 8.7% from 18 to 24, 29.0% from 25 to 44, 28.3% from 45 to 64, and 10.2% 65 or older.  The median age was 38 years. For every 100 females, there were 95.5 males.  For every 100 females age 18 and over, there were 93.3 males.

The median household income was $68,438 and the median family income was $74,524. Males had a median income of $50,988 versus $36,242 for females. The per capita income for the city was $26,598.  About 4.0% of families and 4.9% of the population were below the poverty line, including 6.0% of those under age 18 and 2.8% of those age 65 or over.

Economy

Top employers
According to La Palma's 2010 Comprehensive Annual Financial Report, the top employers in the city were:

Government
According to the California Secretary of State, as of February 10, 2019, La Palma has 8,358 registered voters. Of those, 2,998 (35.87%) are registered Democrats, 2,637 (31.55%) are registered Republicans, and 2,446 (29.27%) have declined to state a political party/are independents.

Education
Los Coyotes Elementary
G.B. Miller Elementary
Steve Luther Elementary
Walker Junior High School
John F. Kennedy High School
Oxford Academy
Beacon Day School for Children with Autism and Related Disorders

Infrastructure

Emergency services
Fire protection in La Palma is provided by the Orange County Fire Authority with ambulance transport by Care Ambulance Service.  The La Palma Police Department provides law enforcement services.

References

External links
 

 
Cities in Orange County, California
Incorporated cities and towns in California
Populated places established in 1955
1955 establishments in California